The Gologo festival, also known as  the Golib festival, is celebrated in the month of March at the end of the dry season  before  the  sewing of the early millet (Ansah, 1997; Allman & Parker, 2005). The Gologo Festival is among the major festivals in Ghana and is celebrated by the chiefs and peoples of Talensi, Tong-Zuf, in the Upper East Region of the country, serving "to reinforce the community belief in the Nnoo shrine or Golib god", which deity regulates Talensi agricultural life. It is a pre-harvest festival celebrated in the months of March and April, with sacrifices offered to seek protection and ensure plentiful rain and a good harvest in the coming season from the earthly gods. The festival has a three-day programme at three different villages. The first part takes place at Gorogo, the second at Yinduri, and the final and biggest at Teng-Zug (Tong-Zuf). Libation is poured at the Teng-Zug shrine to thank the gods for a successful occasion. The one in March is called Gol-diema, which means tutorial. The main Gologo festival is celebrated in the second week in April. Traditional songs are composed by the elders of each community for the occasion and people dance to the composed songs. During this period, noise-making is prohibited and no one mourns their dead. The Gologo festival which is  also known as  the Golib festival is celebrated in the month of March at the end of the dry season  before  the  sewing of the early millet (Ansah, 1997; Allman & Parker, 2005). Tengzug, Santeng, Wakii, Gbeogo, Yinduri/Zandoya, Shia, Gorogo and Spart are the communities which celebrate the festival. There is a special dress code whereby men wear a short knicker and a towel on the chest. Women are also expected to tie a long towel from their chest down to the feet and cover their heads with a special local-made cloth.

Costumes used in Gologo Festival
The Talensi people of Tenzug in the Upper East Region celebrates one of the rarest festivals in the country of Ghana. It is probably the only festival where participants observe a strict compliance to the wearing of certain kind of costume. Due to the nature of this custom, researchers sort to find out the art form which make up the costume and their religious or functional significance. The study used participant observation and interviews to document the festivities before, during and after the festival. The prominent features of the costume includes towels of different sizes and colours, knives of different sizes and the wearing of triangularly shaped aprons. The study concludes that there is the need to advertise the festival in the entire country of Ghana as well as abroad in order to open up the Tengzug area to more tourists and investors.

Preparation of the festival
In the  month of February which precedes  the  festival  celebration, new songs are learnt by  the  communities  for the celebration also new costumes and accessories are procured or prepared. The date for the celebration depends on the appearance  of  the  third moon in each  year. And  this  could appear in March  or  early  April. In 2016,  the new moon surfaced on 9 March. On the first day when the moon appears, the Chief and the Tindaana's  remove their  clothes  (especially shirts and trousers,  and  put  on  traditional regalia meant for the celebration). The people in the  community  also  remove theirs  a day after the chief and the Tindaana have  done so. For community members, the removal involves all clothing covering the upper part of the body, removing all trousers and wearing only boxer shorts, pants  or  shorts  which  have  no  pockets on them, or wearing kpalang or  kpalang  peto. As  such  crying  for  the  dead,  roofing  of  houses,  loud  music  playing  among  other  activities  are prohibited during this period. The communities then begin series of mini festival rites in the towns that surround the Tongo Hills which include dancing and merry making. On the 16th day after the removal of dresses (in 2016, the day was on 24 March), all the communities will congregate at Tengzug for the final festival celebrations.

Relevance of the festival
It is celebrated to ensure “success in all food getting enterprises, security from danger,  disease  and  death” (Insoll, et al., 2013). In  the celebration prayers are said to the  Golib  god led by the  Nnoo  shrine.

References

Festivals in Ghana
Cultural festivals in Ghana
Upper East Region